Domingo Pino (10 March 1922 – 2 December 1986) was a Chilean footballer. He played in one match for the Chile national football team in 1946. He was also part of Chile's squad for the 1946 South American Championship.

References

1922 births
1986 deaths
Chilean footballers
Chile international footballers
Place of birth missing
Association football defenders
Magallanes footballers
Colo-Colo footballers